Whipple Lake is an all-sports, 75-acre lake along the Clinton River.  The lake lies entirely within Independence Township in Oakland County, Michigan.

Whipple Lake is located east of Independence Oaks County Park, west of Pine Knob Road, north of Stickney Road, and south of Oak Hill Road.

Whipple Lake Road is east of the lake.

Whipple Lake connects downstream to 30-acre Crooked Lake and to seven-acre Dark Lake to the northeast.

References

Lakes of Oakland County, Michigan
Lakes of Independence Township, Michigan